Milan Jurčo (born 14 September 1957 in Liptovský Mikuláš) was a Czechoslovak professional road bicycle racer. He is the father of Matej Jurčo, who is a professional cyclist.

Palmares

1981
  Prague World Championships TTT 100 km, Bronze medal
 2nd Milk Race, Prologue
1982
 1st Circuit des Ardennes,General Classification
 1st Tour de Luxembourg 4 Vianden-Diekirch 179km
 2nd Circuit Cycliste de la Sarthe, General Classification
 2nd Tour de l'Avenir, Divonne les Bains-Bourg en Bresse 156km
1984
 1st Rheinland-Pfalz Rundfahrt General Classification
1985
  Giavera del Montello World Championships TTT 100 km, Silver medal
1987
 5th Tour de France Prologue West Berlin, 6,1 km ITT
1988
 3rd Giro d'Italia 21 Vittorio Veneto, 43.00 km ITT
1988
 7th Tour de France 6 Liévin-Wasquehal, 52 km ITT
 3rd Tour de France 21 Santenay-Santenay, 46 km ITT

External links

Guys Having Fun at Tour de France 1988

1957 births
Living people
Slovak male cyclists
Sportspeople from Liptovský Mikuláš